Okrouyo is a town in southwestern Ivory Coast. It is a sub-prefecture of Soubré Department in Nawa Region, Bas-Sassandra District.

Okrouyo was a commune until March 2012, when it became one of 1126 communes nationwide that were abolished.

In 2014, the population of the sub-prefecture of Okrouyo was 113,366.

Villages
The twenty one villages of the sub-prefecture of Okrouyo and their population in 2014 are:

References

Sub-prefectures of Nawa Region
Former communes of Ivory Coast